The National Aquarium, Washington, D.C., was an aquarium in Washington D.C. It was located in the Herbert C. Hoover Building (owned by the General Services Administration), which is bounded by 14th Street NW on the east, 15th Street NW on the west, Pennsylvania Avenue NW on the north, and Constitution Avenue NW on the south. It was the first free and public aquarium in the United States.

The National Aquarium in Washington, D.C. was smaller than its counterpart in Baltimore, Maryland — an also known as the National Aquarium, although independent until the two aquariums signed an alliance in 2003 — with the experience taking around 45 minutes. It closed on September 30, 2013, after 140 years, the longest continuously operating aquarium in the United States at the time.

History

The National Aquarium was established in 1873 in Woods Hole, Massachusetts under the auspices of the United States Commission of Fish and Fisheries by Commissioner of Fish and Fisheries Spencer Baird. It displayed 180 species of fish, reptiles, and other aquatic animals. In 1878, General Orville E. Babcock, the Superintendent of Public Buildings and Grounds in Washington, D.C. suggested a public aquarium in D.C. As a result, Spencer Baird's Fish Commission was given  of land. Because of this, the National Aquarium moved to the Washington Monument in 1878 and consisted of holding ponds known as "Babcock Lakes." During the 1880s, the aquarium moved again into a building called Central Station near the site of today's National Air and Space Museum so that it could better serve its main purpose of being a hatching station for the Fish Commission.

The Fish Commission was incorporated into the Department of Commerce and Labor in 1903 and renamed the United States Bureau of Fisheries, and Secretary of Commerce and Labor George B. Cortelyou called for "...a national aquarium of such size and architectural excellence that it will be a credit to the nation." The Bureau of Fisheries became a part of the Department of Commerce in 1913, and when the Commerce Department building was completed in 1932, the National Aquarium moved to the lower level of the building. The Bureau of Fisheries moved to the Department of the Interior in 1939 and merged with the Interior Department's Bureau of Biological Survey (previously the Department of Agriculture's Division of Economic Ornithology and Mammalogy, among other names) in 1940 to form the Fish and Wildlife Service, an agency of the Department of the Interior. Despite falling under the Department of the Interior, the National Aquarium remained in the Department of Commerce building.

In 2003, the National Aquarium Society Board of Directors signed an alliance agreement with the Board of Directors of the National Aquarium in Baltimore, enabling the two aquariums to work together to strengthen the animal collection and educational impact of the aquarium.

Relationship with the National Aquarium in Baltimore
The National Aquarium is a separate aquarium in Baltimore, Maryland. Founded in 1981, it was originally distinct from the Washington aquarium. Both used the title "National Aquarium;" the National Aquarium in Washington, D.C., was older, while the National Aquarium in Baltimore is larger. Like its Washington counterpart, the National Aquarium in Baltimore is not managed or funded by the federal government, despite the official-sounding names. Neither aquarium is or was part of the Smithsonian Institution.

On September 4, 2003, the National Aquarium Society and the Board of Governors for the National Aquarium in Baltimore announced an alliance, in which the National Aquarium in Baltimore would operate the D.C. aquarium. A signing ceremony hosted by Secretary of Commerce Donald Evans was held at the Commerce Department building.

Collection
The National Aquarium, Washington, D.C., had a collection of over 1,500 specimens and 250 species. Animals in exhibits included longsnout seahorse, leopard sharks, longnose gar, bonytail chub, giant Pacific octopus, chambered nautilus, tiger salamander, eastern hellbender, American alligator, loggerhead sea turtle, red lionfish, and snakehead, as well as
piranha, eel, and Japanese carp.

National Marine Sanctuaries and National Parks Gallery

The National Marine Sanctuaries and National Parks Gallery featured the animals and habitats preserved and protected by America's National Marine Sanctuaries Program. This gallery included exhibits for the Florida Everglades, Channel Islands National Marine Sanctuary, Cordell Bank National Marine Sanctuary, Fagatele Bay National Marine Sanctuary, Florida Keys National Marine Sanctuary, Flower Garden Banks National Marine Sanctuary, and Gray's Reef National Marine Sanctuary. Featured animals included:
 American alligator
 Anemones
 Chain catshark
 Chambered nautilus
 Giant Pacific octopus
 Guineafowl puffer
 Horn shark
 Leopard shark
 Swell shark
 Longsnout seahorse
 Red lionfish
 Scarlet kingsnake

America's Freshwater Ecosystems Gallery

The gallery highlighted American rivers including the Rio Grande, the Potomac River, the Colorado River, and the Mississippi River. Featured animals included:
 Common snapping turtle
 Longnose gar
 Northern snakehead
 American eel
 Razorback sucker

Amphibians Gallery

This gallery showcased salamanders, newts, frogs, and toads to display their adaptations and biology. Featured animals included:
 Eastern newt
 Barking tree frog (Hyla gratiosa)
 Yellow-banded poison dart frog
 Blue-bellied poison frog
 Spotted salamander
 American toad

Amazon River Basin Gallery

The Amazon River and Amazon basin support some of the most diverse life on the planet. Featured animals included:
 Red-bellied piranha
 Silver arowana
 Blue poison dart frog
 Electric eel
 Emerald tree boa

Closure 

The aquarium closed on September 30, 2013, having permanently lost its location due to a renovation of the Herbert C. Hoover Building. When it closed, it was the longest continuously operating aquarium in the United States. Approximately 1,700 fish and other specimens from its collection were moved to the National Aquarium in Baltimore.

Officials of the aquarium considered ways of re-opening it at another location in Washington, D.C., but they eventually abandoned such plans.

References

External links

Aquaria in Washington, D.C.
Museums established in 1873
1873 establishments in Massachusetts
United States Department of Commerce
Defunct aquaria
Museums disestablished in 2013
2013 disestablishments in Washington, D.C.